Pony Lake is a small lake immediately north of Flagstaff Point at Cape Royds, Ross Island. Named by British Antarctic Expedition (1907–09), who built their winter hut adjacent to this lake, because they had their ponies tethered nearby.

Lakes of Ross Island